Gandy may refer to:


Places in the United States
 Gandy, Florida, a census-designated place
 Gandy, Nebraska, a town
 Gandy, Utah, an unincorporated community
 Gandy Creek, Osceola, West Virginia - see Sinks of Gandy

People
 Gandy (surname), a list of people
 Gandy Brodie (1924-1975), American painter

Other uses
 , a destroyer escort built for the United States Navy during World War II 
 Gandy Bridge, crossing Tampa Bay in Florida
 Gandy Freeway, under construction in Pinellas County, Florida

See also
 Gandy dancer, North American slang term for railroad worker
 Gandi, a French company providing domain name registration, web hosting, and related services
 Gandhi (disambiguation)